The 1969 National Soccer League season was the forty-sixth season under the National Soccer League (NSL) name. The season began on May 4, 1969, with Toronto Italia facing Toronto Hellas at Stanley Park Stadium where the match drew 6000 supporters. The match signaled an increase in attendance as the previous time the NSL drew a similar amount was three seasons ago. The championship was contested throughout the regular season as the league canceled the playoff format. Toronto First Portuguese would claim the NSL Championship by finishing first in the standings in October. The NSL Cup was won by Toronto Italia after defeating Toronto Hungaria.  

The NSL became interprovincial once again with a franchise in Montreal, Quebec. The league served as one of the country's top major leagues as both the Toronto Falcons and Vancouver Royals of the North American Soccer League folded in late 1968.

Overview 
The conclusion of the decade sparked a revival that would restore the National Soccer League (NSL) to a level of prominence once more in Canadian soccer. The membership increased to 14 teams the highest since the 1950s with the league returning to the province of Quebec. The previous time the NSL operated in Quebec was in the 1964 season when Montreal Cantalia and Montreal Ukrainians represented the province. Montreal Inter-Italia was granted an NSL franchise. After an eight-year absence, Toronto Italia returned since their initial departure in 1961 to play in the Eastern Canada Professional Soccer League (ECPSL). 

The league expanded into the London, and Oakville regions with the acceptance of Arsenal Portuguese Oakville, and London German Canadians. London previously competed in the London and District Soccer League, and the sole departure from the league was Windsor Teutonia. The season produced a surge in match attendance as the league began to recover from their initial decrease in the mid-1960s due to competition from the ECPSL, and the North American Soccer League. Changes also occurred at the executive level with Joe Piccininni succeeding Bill Boytchuk as league president.   

The NSL was involved in a dispute with the Ontario Soccer Football Association (OSFA) over refusing to issue bond payments to the OSFA. The governing body in response suspended the league, but the NSL continued operations and ultimately consented to paying the bond. Though the OSFA received their payment the suspension remained in effect as another point of contention revolved around player registration and lack of disciplinary actions regarding players. The NSL in response canceled their payments and continued operating as an outlaw league. Shortly after both parties settled their dispute over a meeting.

Teams

Coaching changes

Standings

Cup  
The cup tournament was a separate contest from the rest of the season, in which all fourteen teams took part. The tournament would conclude in a final match for the Cup.

Finals

References

External links
RSSSF CNSL page
thecnsl.com - 1969 season

1969–70 domestic association football leagues
National Soccer League
1969